Paula Christine Hammond  (née Barsby) (13 March 1944 – 25 March 2017) was a British magistrate and businesswoman who was awarded an MBE in 2011 for services to the community of Nottinghamshire.

Early life and education
Born on 13 March 1944 in Long Eaton, Derbyshire, Paula is the fourth daughter of Mabel (née Tarling) and Percy Barsby.

Hammond attended the Grange Primary School then the Long Eaton Grammar School (LEGS) from 1955 to 1961. She organised many reunions for LEGS.

Work 
Hammond's first job was selling broken biscuits at Woolworths. She later worked at the Ministry of Labour before starting the Paula Hammond Playschool which she ran for many years. She also worked in real estate.

Magistrate 
Hammond was a magistrate from 1974–2014. She was only 30 years old and received special dispensation to become a magistrate as the then minimum age was 35. She was Chairman of the Nottinghamshire Bench from 2008–2011.

Hammond served as a magistrate in Nottingham as well as in Ilkeston, Alfreton, Mansfield and Bingham.

Hammond was a frequent speaker on "Life as a Magistrate" 

and "Prison No Way Me". She recalls being called, "Duck", "Love", "Your Royal Highness" while serving on the bench.

Awards 
 Girl Guides, Queen's Guide
 MBE

Community Involvement 
 4th Attenborough Brownies, Founder (1967) and Brown Owl (1967-2009).
 Attenborough Church, Sidesman
 Attenborough Church Social Committee, Chairwoman
 Attenborough Ladies Hockey Club, Founder
 Attenborough Lawn Tennis Club, President 
 Attenborough Parochial Church Council (PCC), Committee member
 Cover Point Health Club, Founder
 Lucy and Vincent Brown Village Hall, Committee member
 Nottingham High School, Governor
 Soar Boating Club
 The Inner Wheel Club of Church Wilne, President
 Toton Brownies Assistant Leader (1959-1967)

Governor 
Hammond was appointed to two three-year terms as a Governor of Nottingham High School as a representative from the Nottingham Magistrates. She was then appointed for another thirteen years as an independent Governor. During her time, the school added Lovell House and started admitting girls.

Trustee 
Hammond was a trustee of

 Carter's Educational Foundation
 The Dorothy Lawson Memorial Bursary
 The Peveril Exhibition Endowment Fund

Family 
Hammond was married with 3 children, and 7 grandchildren.

References

External links
Home Page

1944 births
2017 deaths
English justices of the peace
Members of the Order of the British Empire
People from Long Eaton